Wang Fang may refer to:

 Wang Fang (politician) (1920–2009), former Minister of Public Security of China
 Wang Fang (basketball) (born 1967), Chinese former basketball player
 Wang Fang (synchronised swimmer) (born 1977), Chinese synchronised swimmer
 Wang Fang (athlete) (born 1983), Chinese paralympian
 Wang Fang (rower), Chinese rower

See also
 Fang Fang (born 1955), real name Wang Fang, Chinese writer
 Wangfang, a former town in Liling, Hunan, China